Isradipine (tradenames DynaCirc, Prescal) is a calcium channel blocker of the dihydropyridine class. It is usually prescribed for the treatment of high blood pressure in order to reduce the risk of stroke and heart attack.

It was patented in 1978 and approved for medical use in 1989.

Medical uses
Isradipine is given as either a 2.5 mg or 5 mg capsule.

Side effects

Common side effects include: 

Dizziness
Warmth, redness, or tingly feeling under your skin
Headache
Weakness, tired feeling
Nausea, vomiting, diarrhea, upset stomach
Skin rash or itching

Serious side effects include:  

Lightheadedness or fainting
Shortness of breath, especially from minimal physical activity
Swelling in the hands and feet
Rapid and/or heavy heartbeat
Chest pain

Drug interactions

It is advised that those using Isradipine not take Anzemet (Dolasetron), as both agents can cause a dose-dependent PR interval and QRS complex prolongation.

Itraconazole exhibits a negative inotropic effect on the heart and thus could spur an additive effect when used concomitantly with Isradipine. Onmel/Sporanox also inhibits an important cytochrome liver enzyme (CYP 450 3A4) which is needed to metabolize Isradipine and other Calcium Channel Blockers. This will increase plasma levels of Isradipine and could cause an unintentional overdose of the medication. Caution is advised when administering both agents together.

Tizanidine demonstrates anti-hypertensive effects and should be avoided in patients taking Isradipine due to the possibility of synergism between both medications.

The anti-biotic Rifampin lowered plasma concentrations of Isradipine to below detectable limits.

Cimetidine increased Isradipine mean peak plasma levels. A downward dose adjustment may be necessary with this particular instance of polypharmacy.

Severe hypotension was reported with Fentanyl anesthesia when it was combined with other Calcium Channel Blockers. Even though Isradipine, another Calcium Channel Blocker, has not been used in conjunction with Fentanyl anesthesia in any studies, caution is advised.

Note: There was no significant interaction between Isradipine and Warfarin (Coumadin), Isradipine and Microzide Hydrochlorothiazide, Isradipine and Lanoxin (Digoxin), and Isradipine and Nitrostat (Nitroglycerin).

Overdose
Symptoms of an Isradipine overdose include:
 Lethargy
 Sinus tachycardia
 Transient hypotension

Stereochemistry 
Isradipine contains a stereocenter and consists of two enantiomers, more precisely atropisomers. This is a racemate, i.e. a 1: 1 mixture of ( R ) - and the ( S ) - Form:

References

Further reading

External links
 
 
 Drug offers hope for Parkinson's - BBC News, 11 June 2007.
  - Commentary of Chan et al. publication
  - ArsTechnica - Why neurons die in Parkinson's patients

Calcium channel blockers
Dihydropyridines
Benzoxadiazoles
Carboxylate esters
Methyl esters
Isopropyl esters
Enones